Křišťanov is a municipality and village in Prachatice District in the South Bohemian Region of the Czech Republic. It has about 100 inhabitants.

Administrative parts
Villages of Arnoštov and Markov are administrative parts of Křišťanov.

References

Villages in Prachatice District
Bohemian Forest